Broadview is a census-designated place (CDP) in Cibola County, New Mexico, United States. It was first listed as a CDP prior to the 2020 census.

The CDP is in northern Cibola County on the north side of Milan. New Mexico State Road 605 passes through the community, leading southwest  to Interstate 40 in Milan, and northeast  to San Mateo.

Demographics

References 

Census-designated places in Cibola County, New Mexico
Census-designated places in New Mexico